Larry the Wonderpup is an Australian live action and animated television series which first aired on 7TWO in Australia in 2018. The series is a co-production between Chocolate Liberation Front and WTFN.

Cast
 Ava Houben-Carter as Sasha
 Josephine Croft as Sue
 Claire Gazzo as Larry
 Charlie Crook as Norman 
 Jason Mavroudis as Mateo

References

7two original programming
Australian children's animated comedy television series
2010s Australian animated television series
2018 Australian television series debuts
Australian television series with live action and animation
English-language television shows
Australian flash animated television series
Television shows about dogs